The 2013 Liga Super also known as the Astro Liga Super for sponsorship reasons, is the 10th season of the Liga Super, the top-tier professional football league in Malaysia.

The season was held from 8 January and concluded on 6 July 2013. The Liga Super champions for 2013 was won by Singaporean side LionsXII.

Teams
A total of twelve teams will compete in the 2013 season which includes the top 10 teams that participated in the 2012 season, champion of the 2012 Liga Premier, and the winner of the play-off round between teams finishing 11th to 13th in the Liga Super as well as the team finishing 2nd in the Liga Premier.

Kuala Lumpur was relegated at the end of the 2012 Liga Super season after finishing in the bottom place of the league table. Sarawak, Sabah and Kedah were also relegated after losing the playoffs.

2012 Liga Premier champions Angkatan Tentera Malaysia secured direct promotion to the Liga Super. Meanwhile, 2012 Liga Premier runner-up Pahang clinched the promotion after winning the playoff rounds.

 Kelantan (2012 Liga Super winner)
 LionsXII
 Selangor
 Perak
 Terengganu
 Negeri Sembilan
 PKNS
 T-Team
 Johor Darul Takzim
 Felda United
 ATM1
 Pahang2
Note:
1Promoted from 2012 Liga Premier
2Winners of 2013 Liga Super/Liga Premier Play-off round

Team summaries

Stadium

Matches may not be played at night at stadiums marked with an asterisk (*) because the floodlights do not meet FAM regulations.

Name changes
Johor FC was renamed as Johor Darul Takzim Football Club.

Stadium changes
 Johor Darul Takzim moved to the Tan Sri Dato Hj Hassan Yunos Stadium and will host their home matches there after occupying the previous stadium, Pasir Gudang Corporation Stadium.
 ATM moved to the Selayang Stadium and will host their home matches there after occupying the previous stadium, Petaling Jaya Stadium.
 Felda United moved to the Petaling Jaya Stadium and will host their home matches there after occupying the previous stadium, Hang Jebat Stadium.

Personnel and sponsoring

Coaching changes

Pre-season

In season

Sponsorship changes

Foreign players

Note:
 Teams participating in the 2013 AFC Cup (Kelantan and Selangor) can employ two extra foreign players, as the AFC allows four foreign players, of which one of them must be an Asian player, but the third and fourth foreign players are only allowed to play in the AFC Cup 2013 Tournament.
 LionsXII will not be permitted to have any foreign players as it is intended to remain as a development team for Singaporean players.
FAM allow three foreign players quota starts season 2014.

League table

Results
Fixtures and Results of the Liga Super 2013 season.

Week 1

Week 2

Week 3

Week 4

Week 5

Week 6

Week 7

Week 8

Week 9

Week 10

Week 11

Week 12

Week 13

Week 14

Week 15

Week 16

Week 17

Week 18

Week 19

Week 20

Week 21

Week 22

Fixtures and results

Season statistics

Top scorers

Own goals

Hat-tricks

 4 Player scored 4 goals

Scoring
 First goal of the season: Mohammed Ghaddar for Felda United against Terengganu (8 January 2013)
 Fastest goal of the season: 2 Minutes – Abdul Hadi Yahya for Perak against Kelantan (1 March 2013)
 Largest winning margin: 5 goals
 PKNS 5–0 Felda United (18 May 2013)
 Highest scoring game: 9 goals
 PKNS 4–5 Pahang (6 July 2013)
 Most goals scored in a match by a single team: 5 goals
 PKNS 5–0 Felda United (18 May 2013)
 PKNS 4–5 Pahang (6 July 2013)
 Most goals scored in a match by a losing team: 4 goals
 PKNS 4–5 Pahang (6 July 2013)

Awards

Monthly awards

See also
 List of Liga Super seasons
 2013 Liga Premier
 2013 Liga FAM
 2013 Piala FA
 2013 Piala Malaysia

References

External links
 Liga Super
 Astro Arena

Malaysia Super League seasons
1
Malaysia
Malaysia